Tomiyamichthys russus, also known as the Ocellated shrimpgoby, is a species of goby native to the South China Sea where it can be found on silty bottoms at depths of from , often near the mouths of streams.

References

External links
 

Fish of the Pacific Ocean
Fish of China
Tropical fish
Taxa named by Theodore Edward Cantor
Fish described in 1849
russus